World College of Technology and Management is a private engineering college offering both management and engineering courses, located near Farrukhnagar in Gurgaon, Haryana, India. It is affiliated with Maharshi Dayanand University, Rohtak, Haryana. It was established in 2007 by the Amma Chandravati Educational and Charitable Trust.

History
World College of Technology and Management was established in 2007 by the Amma Chandravati Educational & Charitable Trust, promoted by a group of ex-IITians.

Campus
The campus has a main administrative block and three educational blocks for the academic branches. The campus has both men's and women's hostels, mess, library, canteen, GD room, seminar hall, gymnasium and a football and cricket ground.

Live performances
The college organizes an annual festival its students, called Zenith. Some of singers who have performed in the festival are:- 
 Bohemia, the Punjabi rap star, in April 2010
 Yo Yo Honey Singh performed his dance numbers of "International Villager" in 2012
 Deep Money, the Punjabi singer, in 2013
 Benny Dayal performing his dance numbers in 2014

Gippy Grewal was at the college on 17 April 2014 to promote his Punjabi film, Jatt James Bond

Pictures

References

External links

Engineering colleges in Haryana
Business schools in Haryana
Universities and colleges in Gurgaon
Educational institutions established in 2007
2007 establishments in Haryana
Maharshi Dayanand University